Colonel Christopher John Pickup  (born August 1942) is a retired British Army officer who was chief of staff and regimental colonel of the Army Air Corps. He was later secretary of the Royal Warrant Holders Association and was made a lieutenant (LVO) of the Royal Victorian Order in the 2007 New Year Honours.

Early life

Pickup was born in August 1942 and educated at Abingdon School.

Army career

Pickup served in the British Army from 1960 to 1994 mainly as a helicopter pilot with the Army Air Corps. In 1984 he was awarded the Order of the British Empire (OBE). He became chief of staff and regimental colonel Army Air Corps, a position which he relinquished in 1992. He was replaced by Colonel William McMahon. He is a former director of The Museum of Army Flying.

Civilian life
Pickup was secretary of the Royal Warrant Holders Association from 1996 to 2007. He was made a lieutenant (LVO) of the Royal Victorian Order in the 2007 New Year Honours.

See also
 List of Old Abingdonians

References

People educated at Abingdon School
Living people
Officers of the Order of the British Empire
Place of birth missing (living people)
British Army Air Corps officers
Lieutenants of the Royal Victorian Order
1942 births